Edoardo Alessandro Mapelli Mozzi (born 19 November 1983), also known as Edo, is an English property developer and member of an Italian noble family. He is the founder and chief executive of Banda Property, a property development and interior design company. In 2020 he married Princess Beatrice, a niece of King Charles III. He has a daughter with Beatrice and a son from a previous relationship with Dara Huang.

Background

Mapelli Mozzi was born at the Portland Hospital in West End, London. He is the son of Alessandro "Alex" Mapelli-Mozzi, British Olympian and member of a formerly titled Italian noble family whose ancestral seat is the Villa Mapelli Mozzi in the Bergamo province of Italy.

The BBC states that Mapelli Mozzi is a count; though titles of nobility are not officially recognised in the Italian Republic, they can still be used out of courtesy. That title of nobility of the Kingdom of Italy was given to his family in 1913 by King Victor Emmanuel III to all male descendants bearing the surname of the noble family of Mozzi, that was incorporated to the family of Mapelli. 

Mapelli Mozzi's mother is Nicola "Nikki" Williams-Ellis MBE (née Nicola Diana Burrows),  granddaughter of  Sir Robert Abraham Burrows. She was later married to businessman and Conservative politician Christopher Shale. In 2017, she married the sculptor David Williams-Ellis. Mapelli Mozzi has an older sister, Natalia Alice Yeomans (born 1981), and a younger half-brother, Alby Shale (born 1991).

Career
Mapelli Mozzi attended  the Dragon School in Oxford, then Radley College in Oxfordshire, before obtaining an M. A. in Politics at the University of Edinburgh. 

At the age of 23, with the support of his family, he started Banda, a property development and interior design company, which claims to develop homes in "undervalued" parts of London. This has been challenged by property experts on Twitter and Forbes, who argue that "there is nothing undervalued in Notting Hill", where Mapelli Mozzi's latest project is located, and describe the district as "a super prime residential destination".

Mapelli Mozzi holds directorships in a number of companies, some of them with his mother, Nikki Williams-Ellis, and his brother-in-law, Tod Yeomans. Ahead of the 2016 London mayoral election, Mapelli Mozzi wrote an article for Property Week, urging the future mayor to insist on redevelopment projects in central London. He has also criticised politicians Andrea Leadsom and Jeremy Corbyn.

Cricket Builds Hope

Mapelli Mozzi is a co-founder of the British-Rwandan charity "Cricket Builds Hope", which aims to use cricket as "a tool for positive social change" in Rwanda. Previously known as the Rwanda Cricket Stadium Foundation (RCSF), the charity was founded in 2011 to build Rwanda's first grass wicket cricket ground, now known as Gahanga International Cricket Stadium. Mapelli Mozzi's stepfather Christopher Shale came up with the idea for the charity but died before he could get it off the ground. Shale's family and friends set up the foundation after his death; Mapelli Mozzi's half-brother, Alby Shale, is on the board of trustees. The charity's patrons are Jonathan Agnew, Brian Lara, Heather Knight, Ebony-Jewel Rainford-Brent, Sam Billings and Makhaya Ntini. In 2012, Mapelli Mozzi cycled  overnight in London in the Nightrider Challenge to raise funds for the foundation.

Personal life
Mapelli Mozzi was engaged to American architect Dara Huang until 2018; she is of Taiwanese descent. They have a son, Christopher Woolf, born in 2016. 

In 2018, Mapelli Mozzi began a relationship with Princess Beatrice of York, whom he had known since childhood. His family have been close friends with her parents, Prince Andrew, Duke of York, and Sarah, Duchess of York, for decades. In March 2019, Beatrice attended a fundraising event at the National Portrait Gallery, London, accompanied by Mapelli Mozzi. Following his proposal in Italy, the couple's engagement was announced on 26 September 2019. Mapelli Mozzi was reported to have designed the engagement ring along with British jeweller Shaun Leane. They intended to marry at the Chapel Royal of St James's Palace on 29 May 2020 but postponed the ceremony in light of the COVID-19 pandemic. A private wedding took place at the Royal Chapel of All Saints in Windsor Great Park on 17 July 2020. Beatrice gave birth to their daughter, Sienna Elizabeth Mapelli Mozzi, on 18 September 2021 at the Chelsea and Westminster Hospital. The child is currently 10th in the line of succession to the British throne. Mapelli Mozzi and Beatrice lived at a four-bedroom apartment at St James's Palace, but reportedly moved to a manor home in the Cotswolds in late 2022.

In an August 2021 interview, Beatrice revealed that Mapelli Mozzi, like herself, is dyslexic.

Mapelli Mozzi is active on social media, including Twitter, where he has spoken against plastic pollution in the oceans and whaling in Japan and shared messages about gun control in the United States. He has criticised British politicians Andrea Leadsom and Jeremy Corbyn in the past, and used the hashtag "ImWithHer" on Twitter on the night of the 2016 United States presidential election to show his support for the Democratic candidate Hillary Clinton.

Honours
National honours
  Queen Elizabeth II Platinum Jubilee Medal

Authored articles

Footnotes

References 

1983 births
Living people
21st-century English businesspeople
Alumni of the University of Edinburgh
British real estate businesspeople
English people of Italian descent
Edoardo Mapelli Mozzi
People educated at Radley College
Royalty and nobility with dyslexia
Real estate and property developers